Euchromius matador is a species of moth in the family Crambidae. It is found in eastern Zaire and western Tanzania. The habitat consists of moist woodland, savanna areas and montane areas (up to 1,500 meters).

The length of the forewings is 20–24 mm. The groundcolour of the forewings is creamy white, densely suffused with ochreous to dark brown scales. The hindwings are creamy white to light grey with a darkly bordered termen. Adults are on wing from March to June and again from November to December in two generations per year.

References

Moths described in 1966
Crambinae
Moths of Africa